The Twyman–Stokes Teammate of the Year Award is an annual award in the National Basketball Association (NBA) that recognizes the league's "ideal teammate" who exemplifies "selfless play and commitment and dedication to his team." The award is named after Jack Twyman and Maurice Stokes. The two played together on the Rochester/Cincinnati Royals from 1955 to 1958 until Stokes' career was cut short after he suffered a head injury from a fall during a game against the Minneapolis Lakers. Stokes later became paralyzed due to post-traumatic encephalopathy, a brain injury that damages the motor-control center. Twyman then became Stokes' legal guardian and advocate until Stokes died in 1970.

Every year, 12 players, six from each conference, are nominated by a panel of NBA executives. NBA players then cast votes for the award, with ten points given for each first-place vote, seven for a second-place vote, five points for third, three points for fourth, and one point for each fifth-place vote received. The player with the highest point total, regardless of the number of first-place votes, wins the award. The NBA presents the winner with the Twyman–Stokes Trophy and gives a $25,000 donation to a charity of the recipient's choice.

Los Angeles Clippers guard Chauncey Billups was the inaugural winner of the award in 2013. That year, Miami Heat forward Shane Battier finished second and New York Knicks guard Jason Kidd placed third.

Battier then won the award for the 2013–14 season. Al Jefferson came in second and Dirk Nowitzki finished third.

Tim Duncan won the award for the 2014–15 season. Vince Carter came in second and Elton Brand finished third. After coming in at second the previous year, Carter won the award for the 2015–16 season. Nowitzki is the only international player to win the award. The most recent winner is Milwaukee Bucks guard Jrue Holiday.

Winners

See also

References

External sources

National Basketball Association awards
National Basketball Association lists
Awards established in 2013